The Bombing of Granollers took place during the Spanish Civil War in 1938. On 31 May 1938, the Italian Aviazione Legionaria bombed the town of Granollers. There were between 100 and 224 civilian deaths.

Background
On 16 April 1938, the Anglo-Italian pact was signed. Italy accepted to withdraw her troops from Spain once the war was over and the countries agreed to guarantee the status quo in the Mediterranean. Nevertheless, Italy sent three thousand troops to Spain on 11 April and the Italians continued their bombings against Republican Spain. Franco wanted to eliminate the Republican maritime commerce and destroy the Republican morale. To achieve this, he authorized the Aviazione Legionaria and the Legion Condor to undertake indiscriminate bombings of the Republican cities. Valencia, Barcelona, Alicante and other Spanish cities were bombed.

The Bombing
On 31 May, five Italian bombers of the Aviazione Legionaria, bombed the city of Granollers. The town, 20 miles north of Barcelona, had no military targets. The bombers dropped 40 bombs of 100 kilograms in the city center. There were between 100 and 224 civilian dead (most of them women and children). The British government sent two officers to carry out an enquiry and they reported that the bombing must have been often aimed at non military targets.

Aftermath
The British government and the Vatican protested to Burgos, Berlin, and Rome. Ciano said that Franco ordered the attacks and the Italians were not responsible, but he promised to do what he could, nevertheless he said to the German ambassador that: "Actually, we have, of course, done nothing, and have no intention of doing anything either".

References
Preston, Paul. The Spanish Civil War. Reaction, revolution & revenge. Harper Perennial. 2006. London.  
Thomas, Hugh. The Spanish Civil War. Penguin Books. 2001. London.

Footnotes

External links

Granollers after the bombing.

Explosions in 1938
1938 in Catalonia
Conflicts in 1938
Strategic bombing operations and battles
Mass murder in 1938
Spanish Civil War massacres
May 1938 events
Granollers